Edwin Gharst Corr (born August 6, 1934) is an American retired diplomat who served as a United States Ambassador to several Latin-American nations.

Early life and education
Corr was born on August 6, 1934. is from Norman, Oklahoma. In 1957, he received a B.A from the University of Oklahoma. Corr also has an M.A. from the University of Oklahoma in 1961. He was in the Marine Corps from 1957 to 1960.

Foreign Service
Edwin Corr joined the Foreign Service in 1961.

Between 1978 and 1980 he served as Deputy Assistant Secretary of State for International Narcotics Matters.

Corr served as U.S. Ambassador to Peru (1980–1981), U.S. Ambassador to Bolivia (1981–1985), and U.S. Ambassador to El Salvador (1985–1988).

Iran-Contra
Corr was investigated between 1986 and 1991 for possible involvement in the Iran-Contra scandal. Corr gave voluntary interviews to the Independent Counsel in 1991 before ending his cooperation and invoking his Fifth Amendment right against self-incrimination. Subsequently, a judicial order compelled Corr to testify and forced him to produce documents, under grants of immunity.

Post civil service positions
Corr served as a Professor of Political Science at the University of Oklahoma from 1990 to 1996.

Between 1995 and 2001, Corr was the Director of the Energy Institute of the Americas (EIA), a multi-national non-governmental organization he founded.

Corr served as the Associate Director of the International Programs Center (IPC) of the University of Oklahoma from 1996.

References

External links

1934 births
Living people
People from Norman, Oklahoma
Ambassadors of the United States to Bolivia
Ambassadors of the United States to El Salvador
Ambassadors of the United States to Peru
Iran–Contra affair
University of Oklahoma faculty
People of the Salvadoran Civil War
United States Foreign Service personnel